Laura Pausini is an Italian pop singer. Throughout her career, she has received multiple music awards in Italy and internationally.
She won the Newcomers' section of the Sanremo Music Festival in 1993 and placed third in the Big Artists section in 1994. She was awarded two Lunezia Awards, eight Wind Music Awards, three awards at the Festivalbar, seven Telegatti and an MTV Italian Music Award. Internationally, she has won four awards at the Viña del Mar International Song Festival, four Lo Nuestro Awards, four Latin Grammy Awards, two Billboard Latin Music Award and six World Music Awards. In 2006 she also became the first Italian female artist to win a Grammy Award, receiving the accolade for Best Latin Pop Album for the record Escucha. She has been honoured as a Commander Order of Merit of the Italian Republic by President Carlo Azeglio Ciampi, and as a World Ambassador of Emilia Romagna.

In 2014, she received the Icon Award from FIMI and Italian Trade, in recognition of her estimated worldwide sales exceeding 70 million units.

Academy Awards 
The Academy Awards (the Oscars) are given for artistic and technical merit in the film industry.

!
|-
|style="text-align:center;"|2021 
|"Io sì (Seen)"
|Best Original Song
|
|style="text-align:center;"|
|-
|}

ALMA Awards
The ALMA Awards were established in 1995 by the National Council of La Raza to honor artistic achievement in entertainment obtained by Latin artists. Pausini has received two nominations in 2002.

!
|-
| style="text-align:center;" rowspan="2"| 2002 ||style="text-align:left;"| Laura Pausini || Breakthrough Artist/Group of the Year  ||  
|rowspan="2" style="text-align:center;"|
|-
|Lo mejor de Laura Pausini: Volveré junto a ti || Spanish-Language Album of the Year || 
|-

ASCAP Latin Music Awards
The ASCAP Latin Music Awards are annually assigned to the songwriters and publishers of ASCAP's most performed songs in Latin Music of the year. Pausini has won 5 awards.

!
|-
|style="text-align:center;"| 2003 || "Volveré junto a ti" || Pop/Ballad Song || 
|style="text-align:center;"|
|-
|style="text-align:center;"| 2006 ||rowspan="2"| "Víveme" || Top Rated Theme Song for Soap Opera || 
|style="text-align:center;"| 
|-
| style="text-align:center;"| 2006 || Pop/Ballad Song || 
| style="text-align:center;"| 
|-
|style="text-align:center;"| 2007 || "Como si no nos hubiéramos amado" || Pop/Ballad Song || 
|style="text-align:center;"|
|-
|style="text-align:center;"| 2010 || "En cambio no" || Pop/Ballad Song || 
|style="text-align:center;"|
|-

Billboard awards and accolades

Billboard Latin Music Awards
Established in 1990, the Billboard Latin Music Awards are the longest-running Latin Music Conference. The awards are annually given by the American music magazine Billboard. Pausini has won two awards from four nominations.

!
|-
| style="text-align:center;" rowspan="2"| 2003 || "Surrender"|| Latin Dance Club Play Track of the Year || 
|style="text-align:center;" rowspan="2"|
|-
|"Surrender"|| Latin Dance Maxi-Single of the Year || 
|-
| style="text-align:center;" rowspan="2"| 2006 || Escucha|| Female Latin Pop Album of the Year || 
|style="text-align:center;"|
|-
| "Víveme" || Female Latin Pop Airplay Song of the Year || 
|style="text-align:center;"|
|-

Billboard magazine accolades

!
|-
| style="text-align:center;"| 1995 || Laura Pausini || Female Revelation Artist of the Year ||style="background-color:yellow;text-align:center;"| No. 2
|style="text-align:center;"|
|-

Capri Hollywood International Film Festival
The Capri Hollywood International Film Festival is an annual international film festival held every late December or early January in Capri, Italy. Pausini has won one award in 2020.

!
|-
| style="text-align:center;"| 2020 || "Io sì (Seen)" || Song of the Year || 
| style="text-align:center;"|
|-

Coca-Cola Summer Festival

!
|-
| style="text-align:center;"| 2014 || Laura Pausini || Special FIMI & Italian Trade Icon Award || 
| style="text-align:center;"|
|-

Critics' Choice Awards

David di Donatello Awards

The David di Donatello Awards, named after Donatello's David, are film awards given out each year by the Accademia del Cinema Italiano (The Academy of Italian Cinema).

!
|-
|style="text-align:center;"| 2021 
|"Io sì (Seen)"
|Best Original Song 
|
|style="text-align:center;"|
|-
|}

Diversity Media Awards
The Diversity Media Awards were created in 2016 by Francesca Vecchioni and her foundation, Diversity, to recognize entertainment productions and celebrities supporting LGBT rights in Italy. Pausini has received one award from one nomination.

!
|-
| style="text-align:center;"| 2016 ||style="text-align:left;"| Laura Pausini || Person of the Year || 
| style="text-align:center;"|
|-
|}

Festivalbar
The Festivalbar was an Italian singing itinerant competition, held between 1964 and 2007. Pausini has won three awards in two categories.

!
|-
| style="text-align:center;"| 1994 ||style="text-align:left;" rowspan="3"| Laura Pausini || rowspan="2"| Europe Award || 
| style="text-align:center;"|
|-
| style="text-align:center;"| 1997 || 
| style="text-align:center;"|
|-
| style="text-align:center;"| 2005|| Best Tour of the Year || 
| style="text-align:center;"|
|-

Giffoni All Music Teen Awards

!
|-
| style="text-align:center;"| 2008 ||style="text-align:left;"| Laura Pausini || Best Singer || 
|style="text-align:center;"|
|-

Giustiniano Awards

!
|-
| style="text-align:center;"| 2014 ||style="text-align:left;"| Laura Pausini || Giustiniano Award for Arts and Culture || 
| style="text-align:center;"|
|-

Globo de Platino
Pausini was awarded by the Spanish Institute of Italian Culture with a "Globo de Platino" for contributing in the spread of Italian culture in Spain.

!
|-
| style="text-align:center;" | 1995 || Laura Pausini|| Globo de Platino || 
| style="text-align:center;" |
|-

Golden Globe Awards

Grammy Awards
The Grammy Awards were established in 1958 and are awarded annually by the National Academy of Recording Arts and Sciences of the United States for outstanding achievements in the music industry. Pausini has won one award from two nominations.

!
|-
| style="text-align:center;"| 2006 ||style="text-align:left;"| Escucha|| rowspan="2"|Best Latin Pop Album || 
| style="text-align:center;"|
|-
| style="text-align:center;"| 2017 ||style="text-align:left;"| Similares || 
| style="text-align:center;"|
|-

Hollywood Music in Media Awards
The Hollywood Music in Media Awards (HMMA) is an award organization honoring original music (Song and Score) in all forms visual media. Pausini won one award in 2021.

!
|-
| style="text-align:center;"| 2021 || "Io sì (Seen)"|| Outstanding Song – Feature Film || 
| style="text-align:center;"|
|-

IFPI Platinum Europe Awards
The Platinum Europe Awards, established in 1996 by the International Federation of the Phonographic Industry, recognize artists that have achieved sales of one million copies of an album in Europe. Pausini has received four Platinum Award.

!
|-
| style="text-align:center;" rowspan="2"| 1996 || Laura Pausini||rowspan="4"| Platinum Award || 
| style="text-align:center;" rowspan="2"|
|-
| Laura|| 
|-
| style="text-align:center;"| 1997 ||Le cose che vivi|| 
| style="text-align:center;"| 
|-
| style="text-align:center;"| 2002 ||style="text-align:left;"| The Best of Laura Pausini: E ritorno da te || 
| style="text-align:center;"|
|-
|}

Ischia Music Awards Awards

|-
| style="text-align:center;" | 2007 ||style="text-align:left;" rowspan="2"| Laura Pausini|| rowspan="2"| Ischia Music Awards || 
|-

Italian Embassy honors

|-
| style="text-align:center;" | 1995 ||style="text-align:left;" rowspan="2"| Laura Pausini|| Best Selling International Artist in Spain || 
|-

Italian Music Awards, Wind Music Awards and Music Awards

The Italian Music Awards were an accolade assigned by the Federation of the Italian Music Industry to the best selling Italian and international artists. The first edition was held in February 2001, while the fourth and last edition was held in December 2003. 
The gap left by the Italian Music Awards was later filled by the Wind Music Awards, established in 2007 as non-competitive awards, based on sales certified by FIMI.
In 2014, they were renamed as Music Awards. Totally, Pausini has won 8 awards from 11 nominations.

|-
| style="text-align:center;"| 2001 ||style="text-align:left;" rowspan="3"| Laura Pausini || rowspan="3"|Best Italian Female Artist   || 
|-
| style="text-align:center;"| 2002 || 
|-
| style="text-align:center;"| 2003 || 
|-
| style="text-align:center;"| 2007 ||style="text-align:left;"| Io canto || Album Award || 
|-
| style="text-align:center;" rowspan="2"| 2008 ||style="text-align:left;"| San Siro 2007 || Album Award || 
|-
|style="text-align:left;"| San Siro 2007 (DVD) || DVD Award || 
|-
| style="text-align:center;" |2009 ||style=text-align:left;"|Primavera in anticipo || Album Award || 
|-
| style="text-align:center;"| 2010 ||style="text-align:left;"| Laura Live World Tour 09|| Multi-platinum Award || 
|-
| style="text-align:center;"| 2012 ||style="text-align:left;"| Inedito|| Multi-platinum Award || 
|-
|style="text-align:center;" rowspan="2"|2014 ||style="text-align:left;"|Stasera Laura: Ho creduto in un sogno ||Best Music TV Programme || 
|-
|style="text-align:left;"|20 – The Greatest Hits ||Multi-platinum Award ||

Latin Grammy Awards
The Latin Grammy Awards are accolades annually awarded by the Latin Academy of Recording Arts & Sciences to products recorded either in Spanish or Portuguese.
Pausini has won four awards from ten nominations.

|-
| style="text-align:center;" rowspan="2"| 2001 ||style="text-align:left;" rowspan="1"| Entre tú y mil mares|| Best Female Pop Vocal Album || 
|-
|Laura Pausini and Alfredo Cerruti || Producer of the Year || 
|-
| style="text-align:center;"| 2005 ||style="text-align:left;"| Escucha|| Best Female Pop Vocal Album || 
|-
| style="text-align:center;"| 2007 ||style="text-align:left;"| Yo canto|| Best Female Pop Vocal Album || 
|-
| style="text-align:center;"| 2008 ||style="text-align:left;"| "Vive ya (Dare to Live)" (Andrea Bocelli & Laura Pausini) || Record of the Year || 
|-
| style="text-align:center;" rowspan="2"| 2009 ||style="text-align:left;"| "En cambio no" || Record of the Year || 
|-
|style="text-align:left;"| Primavera anticipada|| Best Female Pop Vocal Album || 
|-
| style="text-align:center;"| 2010 ||style="text-align:left;"| Laura Live Gira Mundial 09 || Best Long Form Music Video || 
|-
| style="text-align:center;"| 2016 ||style="text-align:left;"| Lado Derecho Del Corazón ||Record of the Year || 
|-
|style="text-align:left;"| 2018 || Hazte sentir|| Best Traditional Pop Vocal Album || 
|-

Legend Music Awards
The Legend Music Awards are prizes recognizing artists committed with social and humanitarian issues. Pausini received the award in 2010.

|-
| style="text-align:center;"| 2010 ||style="text-align:left;"| Laura Pausini || Legend Music Award || 
|-

Leggio d'Oro

|-
| style="text-align:center;"| 2010 ||style="text-align:left;"| Amiche per l'Abruzzo || Social Contribution Award(with Fiorella Mannoia, Elisa, Giorgia and Gianna Nannini) || 
|-

LOS 40 Music Awards
LOS40 Music Awards (formerly titled 'Premios 40 Principales') is an awards ceremony hosted annually by the Spanish radio channel Los 40 Principales. Laura Pausini has won one award.

Lo Nuestro Awards
Lo Nuestro is an award presented by television network Univision, which honors the best in Latin music and music video. Nominations are determined by Record companies and Latin radio station program directors.
During her career, Pausini has won four awards from seventeen nominations.

|-
| style="text-align:center;"| 1995 ||style="text-align:left;"| Laura Pausini || Pop Revelation of the Year || 
|-
| style="text-align:center;"| 1997 ||style="text-align:left;"| Laura Pausini || Pop Female Artist || 
|-
| style="text-align:center;"| 1997 ||style="text-align:left;"| "Las cosas que vives" || Video of the Year || 
|-
| style="text-align:center;"| 2002 ||style="text-align:left;"| Laura Pausini || Pop Female Artist || 
|-
| style="text-align:center;"| 2003 ||style="text-align:left;"| Laura Pausini || Pop Female Artist || 
|-
| style="text-align:center;"| 2006 ||style="text-align:left;"| Laura Pausini ||Pop Female Artist || 
|-
| style="text-align:center;"| 2006 ||style="text-align:left;"| Escucha ||Pop Album of the Year || 
|-
| style="text-align:center;"| 2006 ||style="text-align:left;"| "Víveme" ||Pop Song of the Year || 
|-
| style="text-align:center;"| 2006 ||style="text-align:left;"| "Víveme" ||Video of the Year || 
|-
| style="text-align:center;"| 2007 ||style="text-align:left;"| Laura Pausini ||Pop Female Artist || 
|-
| style="text-align:center;"| 2010 ||style="text-align:left;"| Laura Pausini ||Pop Female Artist || 
|-
| style="text-align:center;"| 2012 ||style="text-align:left;"| "Bienvenido" ||Video of the Year || 
|-
| style="text-align:center;"| 2013 ||style="text-align:left;"| "Jamás abandoné" ||Video of the Year || 
|-
| rowspan="4" style="text-align:center;"| 2015 || rowspan="2" style="text-align:left;"| Laura Pausini || Premio a la Trayectoria Musical || 
|-
| Pop Female Artist of the Year || 
|-
|style="text-align:left;"| 20 – Grandes Éxitos ||Pop Album of the Year|| 
|-
|style="text-align:left;"| "Se fue" || Tropical Collaboration of the Year (with Marc Anthony)|| 
|-
| style="text-align:center;"| 2019 ||  style="text-align:left;"| "Amores Extraños" || Replay Song of the Year|| 
|-

Lunezia Awards
The Lunezia Awards were created in 1996 and they annually honor the best lyrics of Italian songs for their musical-literary value. Pausini has received two awards.

|-
|style="text-align:center;"| 2001 ||style="text-align:left;"| "Viaggio con te" || Female Songwriter of the Year || 
|-
|style="text-align:center;"| 2007 ||style="text-align:left;"| Laura Pausini || Lunezia in the World || 
|-

Medimex Awards

|-
| style="text-align:center;"| 2015 ||style="text-align:left;"| Laura Pausini || Best Italian Artist in the World || 
|-

MTV Italy Awards and TRL Awards

The MTV Awards are accolades introduced in 2013 by MTV Italy following the TRL Awards. Prizes are awarded in several categories, based on public's televotes. Pausini received eight nominations and has won one award.

|-
| style="text-align:center;"| 2006 ||style="text-align:left;"| Laura Pausini || Italians Do It Better || 
|-
| style="text-align:center;" rowspan="2"| 2007 ||style="text-align:left;"| Laura Pausini || First Lady || 
|-
|style="text-align:left;"| Laura Pausini || Italians Do It Better || 
|-
| style="text-align:center;"| 2009 ||style="text-align:left;"| Laura Pausini || First Lady || 
|-
| style="text-align:center;"| 2012 ||style="text-align:left;"| Laura Pausini || Wonder Woman Award || 
|-
| style="text-align:center;" rowspan="3"| 2014 ||style="text-align:left;" rowspan="3"| Laura Pausini || Wonder Woman || 
|-
|| TwITStar || 
|-
|| Artist Saga || 
|-

MTV Europe Music Awards
The MTV Europe Music Awards were established in 1994 by MTV Networks Europe to celebrate the most popular music videos in Europe. Pausini has been nominated one time.

|-
| style="text-align:center;"| 2005 ||style="text-align:left;"| Laura Pausini || Best Italian Act  || 
|-

Nickelodeon Kids' Choice Awards, Italy

|-
| style="text-align:center;" | 2006 ||style="text-align:left;" rowspan="3"| Laura Pausini|| rowspan="2"| Best Italian Singer || 
|-
| style="text-align:center;" | 2007 || 
|-
| style="text-align:center;" | 2008 || style="text-align:center;" rowspan="2"| Best Female Singer ||

NRJ Music Awards
The NRJ Music Awards, created in 2000 by the radio station NRJ and the television network TF1, give out awards to popular musicians by different categories. Pausini has received four nominations.

|-
|rowspan="3" style="text-align:center;"| 2003 ||style="text-align:left;"| The Best of Laura Pausini: E ritorno da te || International Album of the Year || 
|-
|| "E ritorno da te" || International Song of the Year || 
|-
|| Laura Pausini || International Female Artist of the Year || 
|-
|style="text-align:center;"| 2004 ||style="text-align:left;"| Laura Pausini || International Female Artist of the Year || 
|-

OGAE Song Contest
The OGAE Song Contest is an audio event in which all OGAE national clubs can enter with an original song released in the previous 12 months in their countries, and sung in one of the country's official languages. Pausini has received one award out of one nomination.

|-
| style="text-align:center;"| 1993 ||style="text-align:left;"| "La solitudine" || Winner of OGAE Song Contest || 
|-

OGAE Video Contest
The OGAE Video Contest is a video event in which different branches of OGAE, can enter with an original song and video released in the previous 12 months in their countries, without any restriction on the song's language. Pausini has received one nomination.

|-
| style="text-align:center;"| 2005||style="text-align:left;"| "Come se non fosse stato mai amore" || Winner of OGAE Video Contest || 
|-

Onstage Awards

|-
| style="text-align:center;"| 2012||style="text-align:left;"| Inedito World Tour 2011–2012 || Best Tour || 
|-

Order of Merit of the Italian Republic

|-
| style="text-align:center;"| 2006 ||style="text-align:left;"| Laura Pausini || Appointed Commander Order of Merit of the Italian Republic || 
|-

Orgullosamente Latino Awards

|-
| style="text-align:center;"| 2005 ||style="text-align:left;" rowspan="2"| Laura Pausini || rowspan="2"| Female Latin Artist of the Year  || 
|-
| style="text-align:center;" rowspan="4"| 2007 || 
|-
|style="text-align:left;" | Io canto || Latin Album of the Year || 
|-
|style="text-align:left;" rowspan="2"| Disparame, dispara || Latin Song of the Year || 
|-
| Latin Video of the Year || 
|-
| style="text-align:center;"| 2008 ||style="text-align:left;"| Laura Pausini || Female Latin Artist of the Year  || 
|-
| rowspan="2" style="text-align:center;"| 2009 ||style="text-align:left;"| Laura Pausini || Best Latin Career  || 
|-
|style="text-align:left;"| Laura Pausini || Female Latin Artist of the Year  || 
|-
| rowspan="4" style="text-align:center;"| 2010 ||style="text-align:left;"| Laura Pausini || Female Latin Artist of the Year  || 
|-
|style="text-align:left;" | aura Live Gira Mundial 09 || Latin Album of the Year || 
|-
|style="text-align:left;" rowspan="2" | Con la musica en la radio || Latin Song of the Year || 
|-
| Latin Video of the Year || 
|}

Paseo de las Estrellas de Tijuana

|-
| style="text-align:center;"| 2014 ||style="text-align:left;"| Laura Pausini || Inducted into Tijuana's El Paseo de las Estrellas || 
|-

Prêmio Contigo!

|-
| style="text-align:center;" rowspan="2"| 2003 ||style="text-align:left;"| "Esperança" || Best Opening Theme for a Telenovela  || 
|-

Premio Italiano della Musica
The Premio Italiano della Musica (English: Italian Award for Music) was an accolade established in 1996 by la Repubblica'''s music supplement Musica! Rock e altro in association with Italian radio station Radio DeeJay, annually broadcast by Italia 1 until 2002, when the last ceremony was held. Pausini has received three nominations.

|-
| style="text-align:center;" rowspan="2"| 2001 ||style="text-align:left;"| Laura Pausini || Best Female Artist  || 
|-
|style="text-align:left;"| Tra te e il mare || Album of the Year || 
|-
| style="text-align:center;" | 2002 ||style="text-align:left;"| Laura Pausini || Best Female Artist  || 
|-

Premios de la Gente
The Premios de la Gente, also known as Ritmo Latino Music Awards, were created in 1999 to award Latin music based on fans votes. Pausini has received one award from four nominations.

|-
| rowspan="3" style="text-align:center;" | 2002 ||style="text-align:left;"| Lo mejor de Laura Pausini || Female Pop Artist or Group of the Year  || 
|-
|style="text-align:left;"| "Volveré junto a ti" || Composer of the Year – Male or Female || 
|-
|style="text-align:left;"| Laura Pausini || Artist of the Year – Male or Female || 
|-
| style="text-align:center;" | 2005 ||style="text-align:left;"| Laura Pausini || Female Pop Artist or Group of the Year  || 
|-

Premio Regia Televisiva
The Premio Regia Televisiva is an annual prize ceremony, awarded to the best Italian television productions and personalities. Pausini received two nominations in 2016.

|-
| style="text-align:center;" rowspan="2"| 2016 ||style="text-align:left;"| Laura & Paola || Best TV Programme  || 
|-
|style="text-align:left;"| Laura Pausini || Revelation of the Year || 
|-
|}

Premios Dial

|-
| style="text-align:center;" | 2006 ||style="text-align:left;"| Laura Pausini || Premio Dial  || 
|-
| style="text-align:center;" | 2011 ||style="text-align:left;"| Laura Pausini || Premio Dial  || 
|-
| style="text-align:center;" | 2015 ||style="text-align:left;"| Laura Pausini || Premio Dial  || 
|-
| style="text-align:center;" | 2016 ||style="text-align:left;"| Laura Pausini || Premio Dial  || 
|-
| style="text-align:center;" | 2019 ||style="text-align:left;"| Laura Pausini || Premio Dial || 
|-

Premios Gardel a la Música

|-
| style="text-align:center;" rowspan="2"| 2002 ||style="text-align:left;"| Laura Pausini || Best Female Artist || 
|-
|Lo mejor de Laura Pausini: Volveré junto a ti || Album of the Year || 
|-

Premios Juventud
Premios Juventud are awards for Spanish-speaking celebrities in the areas of film, music, sports, fashion, and pop culture, presented by the television network Univision. Winners are determined by online vote at Univision's website. Pausini has received seven nominations.

|-
| rowspan="2" style="text-align:center;"| 2005 ||style="text-align:left;"| Laura Pausini || Voz del Momento – Femenina / I Hear Her Everywhere || 
|-
|style="text-align:left;"| "Víveme" || Canción corta-venas / Best Ballad || 
|-
|style="text-align:center;"| 2007 ||style="text-align:left;"|Dispàrame, dispara ||Best video
|
|-
|rowspan="4" style="text-align:left;"|2012 || rowspan="2" style="text-align:left;"| Laura Pausini
|This moment voice ||
|-
|Best pop artist ||
|-
|style="text-align:left;"|Bienvenido || Best video ||
|-
|style="text-align:left;"|Jamás abandoné ||Best song ||

Premios Número 1 de CADENA 100

|-
|style="text-align:left;"|2014 || Laura Pausini || Los Premios Números 1 ||

Premios Oye!
Premios Oye! are presented annually by the Academia Nacional de la Música en México since 2002 for outstanding achievements in Mexican record industry. Pausini has received three nominations.

|-
| style="text-align:center;"| 2007 ||style="text-align:left;"| Laura Pausini || Best Female Artist || 
|-
| style="text-align:center;" rowspan="2"| 2009 ||style="text-align:left;"| Laura Pausini || Best Female Artist || 
|-
|"En cambio no" ||Spanish-Language Theme from a Telenovela, Movie or T.V. Series || 
|-

Rockol Awards

|-
| style="text-align:center;"| 2011||style="text-align:left;"| Inedito || Best Italian Album || 
|-
| style="text-align:center;"| 2011||style="text-align:left;"| "Benvenuto" || Best Italian Music Video || 
|-
| style="text-align:center;"| 2011||style="text-align:left;"| "Benvenuto" || Best Italian Single|| 
|-
| style="text-align:center;"| 2012||style="text-align:left;"| Inedito World Tour || Best Concert or Festival of the Year || 
|-
| style="text-align:center;"| 2013||style="text-align:left;"| "Limpido" || Best Italian Single|| 
|-
| style="text-align:center;"| 2013||style="text-align:left;"| "Limpido" || Best Italian Video || 
|-
| style="text-align:center;"| 2018||style="text-align:left;"| Fatti sentire || Best Album By an Italian Artist or Band – Public Vote || 

Sanremo League
The Sanremo League Award is a competition, launched in 2015 by the organizers of the Sanremo Music Festival, to vote the best song of the Festival della Canzone Italiana. Pausini placed first in the competition with her 1993 entry, "La solitudine".

|-
| style="text-align:center;"| 2015 ||style="text-align:left;"| "La solitudine" || Best Sanremo Music Festival song  || 
|-

Sanremo Music Festival
Pausini has competed two times at Sanremo Music Festival (Festival della Canzone Italiana), the most popular Italian music contest. She has won two prizes from two performances.

|-
| style="text-align:center;"| 1993 ||style="text-align:left;"| "La solitudine" || Newcomers' Section || 
|-
| style="text-align:center;"| 1994 ||style="text-align:left;"| "Strani amori" || Big Artists Section
|style="background-color:yellow;text-align:center;"| Third place
|-

Sanremo Top
Sanremo Top was a televised award honoring the best-selling songs of the Sanremo Music Festival. The ceremony was launched in 1994, when Pausini received the first prize for the song "Strani amori", which was the best-selling song among the ones competing in the Big Artists section.

|-
| style="text-align:center;"| 1994 ||style="text-align:left;"| Laura Pausini || Sanremo Top Award  || 
|-

Satellite Awards

|-
| style="text-align:center;"| 2021 ||style="text-align:left;"| "Io sì (Seen)" || Best Original Song – Film || 
|-

Solarolo Honorary Citizenship
Solarolo is a comune in the province of Ravenna, Emilia-Romagna, Italy, in which Pausini spent her childhood. On 9 June 2006, the municipality conferred the honorary citizenship to Pausini.

|-
| style="text-align:center;"| 2006 ||style="text-align:left;"| Laura Pausini || City Key as an honorary citizen of Comune di Solarolo || 
|-

Telegatto Awards
The Telegatto was a prize sponsored by the Italian weekly listings magazine TV Sorrisi e Canzoni and determined by the magazine's readers.
Pausini has won 7 awards from 8 nominations.

|-
| style="text-align:center;"| 1993 ||style="text-align:left;"| Laura Pausini || Best New Artist || 
|-
| style="text-align:center;"| 1994 ||style="text-align:left;"| Laura Pausini || Best Female Artist || 
|-
| style="text-align:center;" rowspan="3"| 2007 ||style="text-align:left;"| Laura Pausini || Best Singer || 
|-
| style="text-align:left;"| Laura Pausini || Platinum Award for Excellence in Music || 
|-
| style="text-align:left;"| Live in Paris 05 || Album of the Year || 
|-
| style="text-align:center;" rowspan="3"| 2008 || Io canto ||Album of the Year || 
|-
| style="text-align:left;"| Laura Pausini || Best Singer || 
|-
| style="text-align:left;"| San Siro 2007'' || Best Tour || 
|-

Tijuana Honoray Citizenship
Tijuana, Baja California, is a Mexican city. In 2014, Pausini received the City Key as an honorary citizen of the city.

|-
| style="text-align:center;"| 2014 ||style="text-align:left;"| Laura Pausini || City Key as an honorary citizen of City of Tijuana || 
|-

Viña del Mar International Song Festival

|-
| style="text-align:center;" rowspan="4"| 2014 ||style="text-align:left;" rowspan="4"| Laura Pausini || Silver Torch || 
|-
| Golden Torch || 
|-
| Silver Seagull || 
|-
| Golden Seagull || 
|-

Walk of Fame Europe
The Walk of Fame Europe is a boulevard in Rotterdam, the Netherlands, which features 60 stars of celebrities. The original stars collection was launched in 1989. A selection of the stars was later moved to the new walk of fame, inaugurated in 2014.

|-
|  || Laura Pausini || Inducted into the Walk of Fame Europe || 
|-

World Ambassador of Emilia Romagna

|-
| style="text-align:center;"| 2013 ||style="text-align:left;"| Laura Pausini || Appointed World Ambassador of Emilia Romagna region || 
|-

World Music Awards
World Music Awards are annually assigned by the International Federation of the Phonographic Industry and are determined by worldwide albums sales.
During her career, Pausini has won six awards.

|-
| style="text-align:center;"| 1995 ||style="text-align:center;" rowspan="5"| Laura Pausini || Best Selling Italian Recording Artist || 
|-
| style="text-align:center;"| 2003 || Best Selling Italian Pop/Rock Female Artist || 
|-
| style="text-align:center;"| 2007 || Best Selling Italian Artist || 
|-
| style="text-align:center;"| 2010 || Best Female Selling Italian Artist || 
|-
| style="text-align:center;" rowspan="1"| 2014 ||| Career Award || 
|-

Notes

References

Awards
Pausini, Laura